Hulu Selangor Municipal Council (Jawi: مجليس ڤربندرن هولو سلاڠور) is the local authority which administrates Hulu Selangor District. This agency is under Selangor state government. MPHS is responsible for public health and sanitation, waste removal and management, town planning, environmental protection and building control, social and economic development and general maintenance functions of urban infrastructure.

History
Hulu Selangor District Council was established on 1 January 1977 according to Section 2 Local Government Act 1976 (Act 171) by merger of:
 Asam Kumbang Local Council
 Kalumpang Local Council
The total area under the administration of the council is 174,047 hectares.

On October 21, 2021, Hulu Selangor District Council has been officially promoted to Hulu Selangor Municipal Council.

Organisation chart

President
For now, the President Of Hulu Selangor Municipal Council (Yang Dipertua) is Hasry Nor Mohd.

Departments
 Jabatan Perancangan Pembangunan (Planning Development Department)
 Jabatan Khidmat Pengurusan (Management Department)
 Jabatan Kemasyarakatan, Belia dan Sukan (Community, Youth and Sports Department)
 Jabatan Pembangunan dan Penyelengaraan (Development and Maintenance Department)
 Jabatan Kesihatan dan Persekitaran (Health and Environment Department)
 Jabatan Penilaian dan Pengurusan Harta (Valuation Department)
 Jabatan Kawalan Bangunan (Building Control Department)
 Jabatan Perbendaharaan (Treasury Department)
 Unit Audit Dalam (Inner Audit Unit)
 Unit Perundangan (Judicial Unit)

Councilors
2020-2022 Session

Official flower and tree 
Sunflower is the symbol of the Hulu Selangor Municipal Council, on the basis is that it is always cheerful and prepared to serve every customer with efficiency and satisfaction.

The Mahogany tree is the official tree for Hulu Selangor and the main tree being planted at Kuala Kubu Bharu.

Administration Area
Below are the administration area for MPHS which further breakdown into 23 zones.

References

External links 
MPHS official portal

Municipal councils in Malaysia
Hulu Selangor